Jurançon is a commune in the Pyrénées-Atlantiques department in Nouvelle-Aquitaine, France.

Population

See also
Jurançon AOC, a wine from this commune
Communes of the Pyrénées-Atlantiques department

References

Communes of Pyrénées-Atlantiques